Kelvin Rafael Rodríguez Pichardo (born 10 December 1985), commonly known as Kerbi Rodríguez, is a Dominican international football striker playing for Cibao FC in the Dominican first division.

Club career
He played with Santo Domingo's Club Barcelona Atlético until 2009 when he moved to Europe together with Edward Acevedo Cruz and signed with Serbian club FK Veternik. In summer 2010 they both moved to neighboring Bosnia and Herzegovina, more precisely to the administrative division of Republika Srpska, to play on loan with FK Modriča.

National team
Kerbi Rodríguez has been part of the Dominican national team since 2006. He was also part of the Dominican U-20 team during 2007.

International goals
Scores and results list Dominican Republic's goal tally first.

Honours
 Barcelona Atlético
Primera División de Republica Dominicana: 2007 and 2009.
 Cibao
CFU Club Championship (1): 2017

Notes

References

External sources
 

1985 births
Living people
Dominican Republic footballers
Dominican Republic international footballers
Dominican Republic under-20 international footballers
Association football forwards
Club Barcelona Atlético players
FK Veternik players
Expatriate footballers in Serbia
FK Modriča players
Dominican Republic expatriate footballers
Dominican Republic expatriate sportspeople in Bosnia and Herzegovina
Expatriate footballers in Bosnia and Herzegovina
Liga Dominicana de Fútbol players
Cibao FC players